is a railway station on the Hohi Main Line operated by JR Kyushu in Kikuyō, Kumamoto, Japan.

Lines

Layout 
The station consists of an island platform serving two tracks at grade with a siding. The station building is a modern concrete structure which houses a waiting area, a staffed ticket window as well as the Kikuyō town information centre. Access to the island platform is by means of a level crossing.

Management of the station has been outsourced to the JR Kyushu Tetsudou Eigyou Co., a wholly owned subsidiary of JR Kyushu specialising in station services. It staffs the ticket window which is equipped with a POS machine but does not have a Midori no Madoguchi facility.

Adjacent stations

History
On the same day, Sanrigi station was opened as one of several intermediate stations along the track. On 2 December 1928, the entire track from Kumamoto to Ōita was designated as the Hōhi Main Line. With the privatization of Japanese National Railways (JNR), the successor of JGR, on 1 April 1987, the station came under the control of JR Kyushu.

Passenger statistics
In fiscal 2016, the station was used by an average of 542 passengers daily (boarding passengers only), and it ranked 236th among the busiest stations of JR Kyushu.

See also
List of railway stations in Japan

References

External links
Sanrigi (JR Kyushu)

Railway stations in Kumamoto Prefecture
Railway stations in Japan opened in 1914